District Courthouse may refer to:

in the United States
(by state then city)
District Courthouse and Police Station, Hilo, Hawaii, listed on the National Register of Historic Places (NRHP)
Kohala District Courthouse, Kapaau, Hawaii, listed on the NRHP on Hawaii island
Old Third District Courthouse, New Bedford, Massachusetts, listed on the NRHP
St. Louis County District Courthouse, Virginia, Minnesota, NRHP-listed in St. Louis County
U.S. District Courthouse, Hattiesburg, Mississippi, listed on the NRHP in Mississippi
Tallahatchie County Second District Courthouse, Sumner, Mississippi, listed on the NRHP
Third Judicial District Courthouse, New York, New York, listed on the NRHP
Saline District Courthouse, Rose, Oklahoma, listed on the NRHP in Oklahoma
District Courthouse (Aguadilla, Puerto Rico), listed on the NRHP in Puerto Rico
Humacao District Courthouse, Humacao, Puerto Rico, listed on the NRHP in Puerto Rico
Sixth District Courthouse, Providence, Rhode Island, listed on the NRHP
Woonsocket District Courthouse, Woonsocket, Rhode Island, listed on the NRHP

See also
List of courthouses in the United States